In Vietnamese cuisine, bánh tráng nướng or bánh đa nướng is a type of bánh tráng, rice crackers consumed in Vietnam. 

Traditionally, bánh tráng nướng mè are large, round, thick rice crackers with sesame seeds, which can easily shattered into smaller pieces. They can be eaten separately, although they are most commonly added into the vermicelli noodle dishes like cao lầu and mì Quảng. 

They are particularly popular in Đà Lạt and Ho Chi Minh City, Vietnam. Common toppings are egg, ground pork, dried shrimp or fermented shrimp paste, fried shallots, pork floss, scallion oil, hot chili sauce and mayo. Other variations may also include chicken, beef, cheese, butter, spam, or sausage. 

Many types of bánh tráng exist, including the clear sesame seed ones, prawn-like crackers with dried spring onions, and sweet milk.

See also
 List of crackers

References

Rice flour dishes
Bánh